Jimmi Seiter (born James Duke Seiter; May 2, 1945 in St. Louis, Missouri) has worked as a musician, tour manager, artist manager, music producer, sound designer, stage producer and architect.

Seiter is probably best known for his work as road manager, associate producer and touring percussionist with The Byrds and as road manager for The Flying Burrito Brothers with Gram Parsons in the late 1960s and early 1970s.

Early life
Seiter's musical interests developed at an early age while growing up in St Louis. With encouragement from his parents and two brothers who were playing trumpet and piano, Jimmi decided upon drums as his instrument of choice and he quickly developed a keen sense of rhythm and natural timing. His first exposure to live performance soon followed with school recitals on the Admiral cruise boats on the Mississippi in the early 1950s.

As rock and roll music swept into Middle America, Seiter began absorbing many of his earliest influences from that era, which included the music of Bill Haley, Sam Cooke, Ricky Nelson and Elvis Presley. High School provided Seiter with exposure to many more like-minded musicians and he would spend much time hanging out at music rehearsals with his brother Joe's big band style dance band. Seiter's elder brother John Seiter achieved success as a drummer, recording with Spanky and Our Gang in 1967.

During high school, Seiter was invited to join his first rock band with two high school friends that played electric bass guitar and guitar. With the addition of a horn player, the quartet began performing on the teen town dance circuit, later graduating to performances at special events and local clubs. The band later added a female vocalist, Pat Shannahan, and became known as Vince Arter and the High-5s. During this time that the band was introduced to young Ike Turner, already a big name in St. Louis. With his help the band were taught to play R&B alongside members of Ike's backing band and were soon playing the breaks in between Ike Turners headline shows on the night club circuit, gaining valuable musical experience along the way.

After high school graduation, Seiter spent a short time in the US Navy before embarking on a College course studying Architecture and Music. Subsequently, he moved to California to pursue a career in Architecture, securing a job in North Hollywood designing shopping centers.

During his time in Los Angeles, Seiter met and befriended the singer Dobie Gray and soon became involved in the stage production for Gray's musical performances. While embarking on a tour of North California with Gray, Seiter was exposed to many more touring musicians and made valuable contacts, one of whom was currently working as a roadie with The Byrds who at this time were enjoying chart success with hits like "Mr Tambourine Man" and "Turn! Turn! Turn!".

In time, Seiter was invited to assist on a North Californian tour with The Byrds, followed by a tour of Texas, and by that time, had put his architectural career on hold to concentrate on a new and challenging career as road and equipment manager for one of the most influential and exciting bands.

1970s
After a brief stint working with The Flying Burrito Brothers with Gram Parsons in 1969, Seiter returned to working full-time with The Byrds as road manager at the behest of guitarist Clarence White. He was later to be christened "manager by proxy" by Byrds publicist Derek Taylor.

Seiter is an uncredited percussionist on much of The Byrds mid to late era catalogue, and was encouraged to seek acknowledgment and credit for his performances by producer Terry Melcher. Both Melcher and White were also responsible for incorporating Seiter's performance on the drum kit into The Byrds' live shows.

By 1973, the members of The Byrds had disagreements which had begun to unravel the members' relationships. Seiter decided to leave, much to the disappointment of key band members.  Drummer Gene Parsons and bassist Skip Battin were fired soon afterward and eventually Clarence White left the band to Roger McGuinn who was attempting a reunion album featuring the original Byrds lineup, thus spelling the end of the road for the longest-standing lineup of the band.

Seiter moved on to work with other major recording artists of the time such as Alice Cooper, Flo & Eddie, Rocky Burnette and David Cassidy, later expanding his career in studio design and construction management. He also worked on many studio recording projects with his long-time friend Terry Melcher, among others.

Recent years
With his experience and knowledge in the fields of show production, audio, video, lighting, event organization, architecture and construction Seiter has worked on many large-scale events and installations around the world including the L.A. Olympics ceremonies, six subsequent Olympics, over 10 worldwide theme parks and the construction of a city in Kazakhstan.  Most recently, Seiter now lives and works in Macau, China due to his involvement in planning for the Beijing 2008 Olympic Games.

In August 2012, Seiter published 'Volume 1' of a series of autobiographical recollections about his career working with The Byrds and The Flying Burrito Brothers, entitled 'The Byrds - My Way (Volume 1)'. Subsequent volumes are expected to follow.

References

External links

1945 births
Living people
Musicians from St. Louis
The Byrds members
American expatriates in China
American percussionists